Attorney General King may refer to:

Charles D. B. King (1875–1961), Attorney General of Liberia
Gary King (politician) (born 1954), Attorney General of New Mexico
Maurice King (lawyer) (born 1936), Attorney-General of Barbados 
Len King (1925–2011), Attorney-General of South Australia
Troy King (born 1968), Attorney General of the state of Alabama

See also
General King (disambiguation)